Without You I'm Nothing may refer to:

Film and television 
 Without You I'm Nothing (film), a 1990 film by Sandra Bernhard
 Without You I'm Nothing, an upcoming film written by and starring Robin Bain
 "Without You I'm Nothing", an episode of the TV series Ferris Bueller

Music and theatre 
 Without You I'm Nothing (Placebo album), 1998
 "Without You I'm Nothing" (song), the title track
 Without You I'm Nothing (Sandra Bernhard album), 1987
 "Without You I'm Nothing", a song by Eric Saade from Saade Vol. 2
 "Without You, I'm Nothing", a song from the 1956 musical Mr Wonderful

See also 
 Without You I'm Nothing, With You I'm Not Much Better, a 1988 off-Broadway show by Sandra Bernhard, basis for the album and film above
 "Sin ti no soy nada" ("Without You I'm Nothing"), a song by Amaral from Estrella de mar